Borče Jovanovski (born 30 October 1961) is a Macedonian former footballer who played as a defender and made three appearances for the Macedonia national team.

International career
Jovanovski made his debut for Macedonia on 11 October 1995 in a UEFA Euro 1996 qualifying match against Cyprus, in which he scored Macedonia's only goal in the 1–1 draw. He went on to make three appearances, scoring one goal, before making his last appearance on 28 May 1996 in a friendly match against Bulgaria, which finished as a 0–3 loss.

Career statistics

International

International goals

References

External links
 
 

1961 births
Living people
Association football defenders
Macedonian footballers
North Macedonia international footballers
FK Teteks players
FK Vardar players
FK Makedonija Gjorče Petrov players
Macedonian First Football League players
Macedonian Second Football League players
Macedonian football managers